Grafenstein is a town in the district of Klagenfurt-Land in the Austrian state of Carinthia.

Geography
Grafenstein lies in the basin of Klagenfurt, about 12 km east of Klagenfurt on the Wörth Lake.

References

Cities and towns in Klagenfurt-Land District